Sundebru is a village in Gjerstad municipality in Agder county, Norway. The village is located on the west side of the southern end of the lake Gjerstadvatnet. The village lies north of Fiane and Eikeland, east of Gryting, and west of Østerholt. The village of Sundebru sits just north of the junction of Norwegian County Road 418, Norwegian County Road 417, and European route E18.

References

Villages in Agder
Gjerstad